Jianqing Fan (born 1962) is a statistician, financial econometrician, and writer. He is currently the Frederick L. Moore '18 Professor of Finance, a Professor of Statistics, and a former Chairman of Department of Operations Research and Financial Engineering (2012–2015) at Princeton University.

Research 
Fan is interested in statistical theory and methods in data science, finance, economics, risk management, machine learning, computational biology, and biostatistics, with a particular focus on high-dimensional statistics, nonparametric modeling, longitudinal and functional data analysis, nonlinear time series, wavelets, among other areas.

Career
Jianqing Fan is the co-editor of Journal of Business and Economics Statistics (2018-). He was the co-editor of The Annals of Statistics (2004–2006), a co-editor of Econometrics Journal (2007–2012), a co-editor and managing editor of Journal of Econometrics, and an editor of Probability Theory and Related Fields (2003–2005), as well as a member of the editorial boards of numerous journals including the Journal of American Statistical Association, Annals of Statistics, Econometrica, Management Science and Journal of Financial Econometrics. He has served as President of the Institute of Mathematical Statistics (2006–2009), and as President of the International Chinese Statistical Association (2008–2010).

After receiving his Ph.D. in Statistics from the University of California, Berkeley in 1989, he joined the statistics faculty at the University of North Carolina at Chapel Hill (1989–2003) and the University of California at Los Angeles (1997–2000). He was then appointed Professor of Statistics and Chairman at the Chinese University of Hong Kong (2000–2003), and as a professor of Operations Research and Financial Engineering (2003–) and Frederick L. Moore'18 Professor in Finance (2006–) at Princeton University. He directed the Committee of Statistical Studies at Princeton (2005-2017) and chaired the Department of Operations Research and Financial Engineering (2012-2015).

He has coauthored four well-known books (Local Polynomial Modeling (1996), Nonlinear time series: Parametric and Nonparametric Methods (2003), Elements of Financial Econometrics (2015), and Statistical Foundations of Data Science (2020)) and authored or coauthored over 250 articles on high-dimensional statistics, machine learning, finance, economics, computational biology, semiparametric and non-parametric modeling,  nonlinear time series, survival analysis, longitudinal data analysis, and other aspects of theoretical and methodological statistics. He has been consistently ranked as a top 10 highly-cited mathematicians. He has received various awards in recognition of his work on statistics, financial econometrics, and computational biology. These include the 2000 COPSS Presidents' Award, given annually to an outstanding statistician under age 40; an invitation to speak at The 2006 International Congress for Mathematicians; the Humboldt Research Award for lifetime achievement in 2006; the Morningside Gold Medal of Applied Mathematics in 2007, honoring triennially an outstanding applied mathematician of Chinese descent; a Guggenheim Fellowship in 2009;  presented every three years by the International Chinese Statistical Association to individuals under the age of 50; and the Guy Medal in Silver (2014), presented once a year by the Royal Statistical Society, and Noether Senior Scholar Award, presented annually by the American Statistical Association.

Fan has many affiliations within Princeton University and worldwide. He has been on the scientific advisory boards at various institutions, including the Institute of Economics, Academia Sinica  (08–19), Academia Sinica, Statistical and Applied Mathematical Sciences Institute (08–14), Institute of Mathematical Sciences (11–16) at National University of Singapore, among others.

Honors and awards
 COPSS Presidents' Award, 2000, Committee of Presidents of Statistical Societies.
 Invited speaker at the 2006 International Congress of Mathematicians
 Humboldt Research Awards, Alexander von Humboldt Foundation, 2006.
 Morningside Gold Medal of Mathematics, 2007. 
 Guggenheim Fellow, 2009. 
 Academician, Academia Sinica, 2012.
 Pao-Lu Hsu Prize, 2013
 Guy Medal in Silver, 2014
 Noether Senior Scholar Award
 Fellow, American Association for Advancement of Science.
 Fellow, Institute of Mathematical Statistics.
 Fellow, American Statistical Association.
 Fellow, Society of Financial Econometrics.
 Elected Member, International Statistical Institute

References

External links

1962 births
Living people
20th-century Chinese mathematicians
20th-century Chinese writers
21st-century Chinese mathematicians
21st-century Chinese writers
Chinese economics writers
Chinese statisticians
Econometricians
Economics journal editors
Economists from Fujian
Educators from Fujian
Elected Members of the International Statistical Institute
Fellows of the American Statistical Association
Financial economists
Fudan University alumni
Mathematicians from Fujian
Members of Academia Sinica
People from Putian
Presidents of the Institute of Mathematical Statistics
Princeton University faculty
UC Berkeley College of Letters and Science alumni
University of California, Los Angeles faculty
University of North Carolina at Chapel Hill faculty
Writers from Fujian
Annals of Statistics editors